Washington Township is an inactive township in St. Clair County, in the U.S. state of Missouri.

Washington Township was erected in 1841, taking its name from President George Washington.

References

Townships in Missouri
Townships in St. Clair County, Missouri